Coping with Cupid was a 1991 short sci-fi romance film written and directed by Viviane Albertine, produced by the British Film Institute.

Plot
Three beautiful blonde aliens are sent to Earth to find the recipe of romantic love in 48 hours. They ask passers-by in Soho and are offered all kinds of responses. This doesn't get them anywhere and they're in danger of being trapped in loneliness.

Cast
Yolande Brener as Blonde 1
Fiona Dennison as Blonde 2 
Melissa Milo as Blonde 3 
Sean Pertwee as Peter 
Liz Greene as woman in street 
John Kobal as man in hallway 
Ros Coward as woman in doorway 
Lucy Goodison as voice on Walkman 
P. Hildebrand as man in wardrobe 
Richard Jobson as man at photo booth 
Don Letts as man on train 
Shere Hite as woman on TV 
Lorelei King as Captain Trulove (voice) 
Hetty Baynes as blondes (voice)

References

External links

1991 short films
1991 films
1990s science fiction films
British science fiction short films
1990s English-language films
1990s British films